

The Bishop of Warrington is an episcopal title used by a suffragan bishop of the Church of England Diocese of Liverpool, in the Province of York, England. The title takes its name after the town of Warrington in Cheshire; the current bishop's official residence is in Eccleston Park, St Helens.

List of bishops of Warrington

References

Bibliography

External links
 Crockford's Clerical Directory - Listings

 
Warrington